Hellenic Shipyards S.A. is a large shipyard in Skaramagas, in West Athens regional unit, Greece.

History 
Commonly known as Skaramaga Shipyards (Greek: Ναυπηγεία Σκαραμαγκά), from the area where they are located, its origins are connected with the Royal Hellenic Naval Shipyard created in 1937 in order to build warships. Despite heavy investment and an order of 12 destroyers and a number of submarines (of which 2 destroyers were in initial stages of construction), development ceased due to the Second World War while in 1944 the facilities were virtually destroyed by Allied bombing. Operation started in 1957 when Greek business tycoon Stavros Niarchos purchased the ruined shipyard and rebuilt and expanded its facilities; since then the company has built many civilian and military ships.

Military constructions include Greek-designed fast patrol boats and gunboats, as well as frigates, fast attack crafts, submarines, etc. based on French or German designs. A company division is involved in metal and machinery constructions, including specialized constructions for the Greek industry, structures and platforms for offshore drilling, cranes, etc. A special branch has also been created since 1986, for the mass production of various types of railcars (diesel and electric) and railroad cars (passenger and freight), mostly on German designs.

The company was bought in 2002 by a group of German investors under the industrial leadership of the German shipyard Howaldtswerke-Deutsche Werft (HDW), later a subsidiary of the German ThyssenKrupp Marine Systems. However, serious yard mismanagement by the German TKMS group has caused a decline of the shipyard, and reduction of employees to 1,300 in 2009 (from about 6,200 in 1975).

On March 1, 2010, an agreement was reached to sell 75.1% of the company to Abu Dhabi Mar.

Privatisation 
Greece's finance ministry had launched an international tender for the privatisation of the largest eastern Mediterranean shipyard "Skaramanga shipyard".

Ships built by Hellenic Shipyards

Several ship types, commercial (general cargo, bulk carriers, tankers, tugboats, super yachts, ferries and other passenger ships) and military, among which:

 La Combattante IIIb-class fast attack craft
 HSY-55-class gunboat
 Osprey HSY-56A-class gunboat
 Meko-200HN (built under license by parent company HDW)
 Type 214 submarines (built under license by parent company HDW)

Ships repaired at Hellenic Shipyards
Thousands of ships, among which:

HS Tombazis (D-215) - repaired between November 1978 and May 1979Brittany (ex-Bretagne''), a Chandris Lines cruise ship that was accidentally destroyed by fire in April 1963 as repairs neared completion

References

External links 

 
Hellenic Shipyards Atlantis Superyacht, in World's 100 largest superyachts
A very large gallery of photographs and documents of the shipyard

Shipbuilding companies of Greece
Locomotive manufacturers of Greece
West Athens (regional unit)
Greek brands
Vehicle manufacturing companies established in 1957
Defence companies of Greece
Greek companies established in 1957
Greek companies established in 1937
Vehicle manufacturing companies established in 1937